JLIVECD is an open source CLI (command line interface) based live CD/DVD customization tool for Debian, Arch Linux, Ubuntu family distributions and Linux Mint and some of their derivatives. The host system is not restricted to be the same as the live CD/DVD system (e.g Arch Linux live CD can be modified on a Ubuntu host, Ubuntu live CD can be modified on a Debian host etc.).

This tool is released under GPL-2 and primarily intended for non-commercial use.

History 
It was developed with the help of the documentation found on LiveCDCustomization written by the Ubuntu community, Debian/Modify/CD from Debian wiki and Remastering the install ISO from Arch Linux wiki.

Uses 
One needs to know the customization methods to make use of this tool because it does no customization itself at all; It only prepares the environment for customization and automates the task of creating a customized live CD/DVD ISO image. A base ISO image is needed on which customization will be brought upon. The resulting ISO image can then be burnt into a CD or DVD or a bootable live USB can also be prepared to use it.

Related documentations 
 How to customize Linux Mint live CD/DVD
 LiveCDCustomization
 Debian/Modify/CD
 Remastering the install ISO

See also 
 Ubuntu Customization Kit
 Reconstructor
 Remastersys
 List of remastering software

References & External Links 
 README.md
 JLIVECD
 https://help.ubuntu.com/community/LiveCDCustomization

Linux software
Live CD